Albert Malcolm Hersee (1864–1922) was a Welsh international footballer. He was part of the Wales national football team, playing 2 matches. He played his first match on 27 February 1886 against Ireland  and his last match on 10 April 1886 against Scotland. At club level, he played for Bangor.

He was the elder brother of Richard Hersee.

See also
 List of Wales international footballers (alphabetical)

References

1864 births
1922 deaths
People from Llandudno
Sportspeople from Conwy County Borough
Welsh footballers
Wales international footballers
Bangor City F.C. players
Date of death missing
Association footballers not categorized by position